Medel may refer to:

Medel (surname)
Medel (Lucmagn), a municipality in Graubünden, Switzerland
MEDEL, a European association of judges and public prosecutors
MED-EL, manufacturer of implantable hearing solutions